Thai Airways International Flight 261 (TG261/THA261) was a scheduled domestic passenger flight from Bangkok's Don Mueang International Airport to Surat Thani International Airport in Surat Thani, Thailand. The flight was operated by Thai Airways International, the flag carrier of Thailand. On 11 December 1998, the aircraft, an Airbus A310-204 registered in Thailand as HS-TIA, stalled and crashed into a swamp during its landing attempt at Surat Thani Airport. A total of 101 people were killed in the crash.

Thailand's Aircraft Accident Investigation Committee (AAIC) opened an investigation into the accident. The investigation revealed that the crew were disoriented. As their attempts to land at the airport had failed multiple times, the crew became upset, causing them to not maintain awareness of the condition of their aircraft until it started to enter an upset condition. The pilots failed to recover the aircraft and the aircraft crashed into the swamp.

The accident was the second deadliest plane crash in Thailand, behind Lauda Air Flight 004. It was the fifth worst accident involving the Airbus A310, the fourth hull loss of an Airbus A310.

Aircraft 
The aircraft with registration HS-TIA was an Airbus A310-204, c/n 415, previously registered as F-WWBI for flight testing with Airbus. Given the name Phitsanulok, HS-TIA was first flown on 3 March 1986 and delivered to Thai Airways on 29 April 1986.

Passengers and crews 
Flight 261 was carrying 132 passengers and 14 crew members. There were 25 foreigners on board the flight, including nationalities from Austria, Australia, Britain, Finland, Germany, Israel, Japan, Norway, and the United States. The rest of the passengers were Thais.

The captain, Pinit Vechasilp, had 10,167 flight hours, including 3,000 hours on the Airbus A300-600/A310.

The unnamed first officer has been reported to have 2,839 flight hours, with 983 of them on the Airbus A300-600/A310.

Accident 
Flight TG261 departed from Bangkok's Don Mueang International Airport with 132 passengers and 14 crew members at 17:40 local time to Surat Thani, a gateway city for popular resort island of Koh Samui in Thailand. It was cleared to fly at flight level 310. The estimated flight time was one hour and 55 minutes. At the time, Thailand was hosting the 1998 Asian Games and many schools had been closed due to the event. Many Thais had headed to holiday resorts.

At 18:26 local time, the co-pilot contacted Surat Thani controller for approach. The aircraft, at the time, was located at 70 nautical miles from the airport. Surat Thani Airport cleared the flight for an approach under the Instrument Flight Rules. The weather at Surat Thani Airport was in good condition with good visibility and calm wind.

At 18:39 local time, the co-pilot contacted Surat Thani to report Flight 261's position. Surat Thani controller then stated that the Precision Approach Path Indicator on the right side of the runway 22 was not functional and the indicator on the left side was in use. Two minutes later, Flight 261 was cleared to land. The flight crews were cautioned of slippery runway due to deteriorating weather conditions.

At 18:42 local time, the runway was sighted and the pilots attempted to land the aircraft. They then decided to go-around for a second approach. The flight was cleared for its second landing attempt. This time, however, the pilots could not see the runway and opted for another go-around.

At 19:05 local time, the flight crews were informed of the weather in the area, which was acknowledged by the crew members. The weather in the area deteriorated, and the visibility was reduced from 1,500 meters to 1,000 meters. The pilots informed the passengers on the deteriorating weather conditions and announced that they would attempt another landing for the third time and stated that if they failed again they would divert the flight back to Bangkok.

During its go-around, the angle of attack of the aircraft gradually increased from 18 degrees to 48 degrees. The speed of the aircraft began to decay and the aircraft began to shake. It entered an aerodynamic stall. As it began to shake, surviving flight attendants recounted that passengers began to scream and jump out of their seats, with luggage reportedly "flying around everywhere".

The Airbus A310 crashed onto a swampy ground near a flooded rubber plantation and exploded, bursting into flames. The crash site was located 760 yards from the runway. Many of the occupants were drowned by the waist-deep water, while the remaining survivors had to crawl to escape from the wreckage. Local residents immediately rushed to the crash site to rescue the survivors. Search and rescue operation was hampered by the location of the crash, which was on a swamp. Rescuers reported that most of the survivors were seated at the front portion of the aircraft.

More than 400 soldiers and police were deployed to assist in the rescue operation. By 12 December, rescuers managed to retrieve 100 bodies from the crash site. Overstretch on the resources caused the set up of makeshift morgue in Surat Thani International Airport. The bodies were laid on the main lobby and the body bags were opened in view of queuing passengers. Many of the bodies were burnt beyond recognition, causing difficulties on the identification process. Identification of the victims was also hampered by the fact that passengers were not required to fill a form for a domestic flight.

Search operation was suspended on 13 December after the last victim was recovered. In total, 101 passengers and crew, including both the pilot and the co-pilot, were killed in the crash. Forty-five people survived, with 30 people suffering serious injuries. Among the survivors were 12 foreigners (three Australians, three Japanese, three Germans, two Israelis and one Briton) and Thai actor and singer Ruangsak Loychusak.

Investigation 
A search for the flight's black boxes was immediately conducted. The search was initially hampered due to the ground conditions at the crash site.  Both the flight data recorder (FDR) and the cockpit voice recorder (CVR) were eventually found by the search and rescue team, and were taken from the crash site for further investigation. Both recorders were sent to the National Transportation Safety Board (NTSB) in the United States for readout analysis. Pieces of the wreckage were recovered and were taken off site for further inspection by Thai investigators. Airbus, the aircraft manufacturer, announced that they would send a team of specialists to assist Thai authorities in the crash investigation.

Mobile phone usage 
There were fears that the use of mobile phones on board the aircraft had caused it to crash. Investigators tried to probe on whether there was a link between the use of mobile phones and the crash. According to the investigation, only a few studies had been conducted on the effect of mobile phone to aircraft's equipment. There were no evidence that the use of mobile phone would interfere with the aircraft's navigation system, communication and even the operation of the aircraft as a whole. At the time, FAA had not set strict policy on in-flight mobile phone use.

Both flight recorders didn't find any abnormalities on the navigation aids and on the flight control systems. The possibility that the use of mobile phone had caused the crash, therefore, was dismissed.

Landing difficulty 
In the initial aftermath of the accident, many believed that the weather played a major factor in the disaster. A heavy rainstorm caused by Tropical Storm Gil was reportedly present prior to Flight 261's landing. Several survivors and victims relatives questioned the pilots decision to land at the airport even though the weather was not in acceptable condition for landing. Airline officials had told crew members to fly according to the company's procedures, in which pilots should not land if the meteorological condition in the area was inclement. Investigators stated that bad weather was the probable cause of the accident, without ruling out pilot error. Other possible causes were also being investigated.

According to the available weather data, at the time of the accident the wind was blowing at 3 knots with a visibility of 1,000 meter with rain reportedly present.

Reports also emerged that the runway at Surat Thani Airport was lacking an essential navigation system. Airport officials only commented that the radio navigation system was working normally and declined to comment further on the issue.  Thai officials confirmed that a part of the navigation system, called the Instrument landing system (ILS), had to be taken off-line due to an expansion program at the airport. The system was scheduled to be put back on-line, however the subsequent 1997 Asian financial crisis caused it to be postponed. A Thai air force pilot stated that due to the removal of the Instrument landing system (ILS), pilots had to use a radio navigation system which was less accurate.

The investigation further revealed that the airport's non-directional beacon (NDB) had also been turned off.

At the time of the accident, several lights at the runway end were unlit as the lights were turned off due to a renovation at the airport. This caused the distance between the lights to change at a distance of 6 meter between each other rather than the usual 3 meter. The approach lights were also not turned on. The inclement weather condition and the unlit condition of the runway would make it harder for the pilots to see the runway and to land at the airport.

Factors leading to stall 
In all of the flight crew's attempts to approach Surat Thani, the pilots always saw the runway at their right side rather than at the front side. This was caused by the placement of the VOR (used as an approach aid by the airport), which was located at the left side of the runway rather than at the middle of the runway (at track 225 degree). In Flight 261, the pilots were on track 215 degree with a visibility of less than 2,000 meters. As such, the pilots were able to see the runway only if they had passed the runway centreline. In all of their attempts to land, they were too far left of the runway. It was a difficult approach for the pilots and this might have explained why the flight had gone through multiple go-around attempts. Additionally, the pilots were not familiar with non-precision approach.

During the first attempt, the wind was calm and the visibility was 1,500 meters. The co-pilot sighted the runway and the pilot tried to land at the runway. However, the pilot announced that they were unable to land and decided to go-around. As they initiated the go-around, the pilot noticed the high rate of climb of the aircraft. The co-pilot stated that it might have been caused by the light weight of the aircraft (Flight 261 was 102 tons while its permissible landing weight was 122 tons). The engines gradually increased and there was a low pitching up moment. Investigators noted that no signs of pilot fatigue were found in the first go-around attempt.

In the second attempt, the pilots decided to use the autopilot. The pilots tried to see the runway. This time, they were unable to see the runway. The unlit condition of several lights at the airport had caused confusion on the pilots. The pilots then decided to go-around with the autopilot and the autothrottle.

In the third attempt, the controller in Surat Thani informed the flight crew that the visibility had deteriorated to 1,000 meters. Both pilots began to worry on the matter. The co-pilot then reported "final approach fix" and the controller cleared Flight 261 to land. The pilots then disengaged the autopilot.

The flight crew of Flight 261 had attempted to land at the airport for at least 2 times. At the time of the accident, the flight crew were attempting their third attempt. If they failed all three attempts, then the flight would have to return to the departure airport (Bangkok), even though they had arrived at the destination airport. The low visibility, the difficult landing attempt in Surat Thani, and the possibility of going back to Bangkok caused a heavy workload on the pilots of Flight 261. The flight crew's attention was channelized due to the stress, causing them to work in not optimal condition. It would also endanger their situational awareness.
  
The aircraft involved in the accident was an Airbus A-310, a medium range airliner equipped with 2 large turbo 
fan engines, both of which were located under swept back wings. According to investigators, if the pilots decided to trigger the go lever during go-around mode, the autothrottle system would move the throttle forward at a rate of 8 degree per second. This would cause the aircraft's nose to pitch up. If the pilots decided to use the autopilot, the pitch attitude would be regulated by the system. However, if the pilots decided to use manual control and the pilots were not aware with their surrounding, there would be a chance in that the pilots would lose control of the aircraft's pitch, causing the aircraft to enter an upset.

As the pilots began their third attempt, the pilots were manually flying the aircraft. They were unable to see the runway until they were too close. The flight crew then declared "cannot land, cannot land" and decided to go-around. The pilots then decided to trigger the go lever (autothrottle). The engines then spun from 59% to 102% in a span of 8 seconds. The aircraft quickly pitched up, which was described by a surviving flight attendants as "the pilots pulling up the aircraft harshly".

The pilots felt familiar with the nose up moment that had happened in their first and second go around. Thus, they didn't consider the possibility that the aircraft would ever enter an upset condition in the third attempt. The pitch continued to increase and the pilots tried to level the pitch with the aircraft's elevator. It managed to decrease the pitch rate for a small amount. However, it then started to increase again, reaching as high as 40 degree. The pilots, again, applied the elevator to decrease the pitch. The pitch was decreased to 32-33 degree for approximately 6 seconds. The pilots then suddenly did not apply the elevator anymore, causing the pitch to increase to 47-48 degree. By this time, the speed had decayed to 100 knots. The aircraft then entered a stall and crashed onto the swamp.

Management oversight 
In the same year, Thai Airways International began reducing the number of its foreign pilots. Vice-president of the company, Chamlong Poompuang, stated that pilots were trained to exercise high caution. At the same time, he recognized that the airline had undertaken fuel-saving measures due to the economic downturn, but that flight operations should not be performed if safety was compromised. Thai Airways International chairman, Thamnoon Wanglee emphasized, "Safety is our highest priority. What our policy is, and what happened, are two different things."

Conclusion 
Thailand's Aircraft Accident Investigation Committee concluded the cause of the crash as follows:

Aftermath
Thai Airways International offered compensation payment to the families affected by the crash. Chairman Wanglee stated in a news conference that each relative of the 101 victims of the crash would receive a compensation payment of US$100,000, while the 45 injured survivors would receive a compensation of 200,000 baht (US$5,600) each. The airline would pay their medical expenses.

Television episodes
 Modernine TV discussed Thai Airways International Flight 261 on TimeLine, 30 May 2016, in "Flight 261 Disaster".

See also
 China Airlines Flight 140

References

External links
 Cockpit Voice Recorder transcript and accident summary 
 Victims of Flight 261 from Associated Press Archive

1998 in Thailand
1998 disasters in Thailand
Accidents and incidents involving the Airbus A310
Airliner accidents and incidents caused by pilot error
Airliner accidents and incidents caused by weather
Aviation accidents and incidents in 1998
Aviation accidents and incidents in Thailand
December 1998 events in Asia
261
1998 meteorology
Airliner accidents and incidents caused by stalls